Healthdirect Australia, otherwise known as just Healthdirect and formerly the National Health Call Centre Network, is the national health advice service in Australia. Funded by the Australian Government and all state and territory governments excluding Queensland, Healthdirect provides a number of 24/7 health helplines to all Australians.

The Healthdirect website provides general health advice, a symptom checker which compares symptoms against clinical presentations, and a health directory which lists many primary, secondary and tertiary care services.

History
In February 2006, the Council of Australian Governments (COAG) signed a Heads of Agreement to establish the National Health Call Centre Network (NHCCN). The NHCCN commenced delivering services in July 2007, with its core service operating under a single national name, healthdirect Australia, and national phone number - 1800 022 222.
In December 2012, the NHCCN changed its trading name to Healthdirect Australia, reflecting the organisation’s evolution from procuring and managing telephone triage services to offering multiple services with integrated telephone and online channels. This was followed in November 2015 by the change of the registered name to Healthdirect Australia Limited. After a review of after-hours primary health care in July 2015, Healthdirect Australia began to operate locally tailored after-hours services and new GP advice and support lines. Since March 2020, Healthidrect has been operating the National Coronavirus Helpline (NCH) providing telephone advice to the public. It has handled more than four million calls.

Services
Healthdirect Australia's services include a helpline available 24 hours a day, an after-hours general practitioner (GP) helpline,  the healthdirect website (which provides free health information),  an app for mobile devices, and a Symptom Checker (a guided, online self-triage tool allowing visitors to initiate their health enquiry online).  The Pregnancy, Birth and Baby service includes a telephone helpline and a website, providing support to families of children aged up to 5 years. Healthdirect services also include the National Health Services Directory (NHSD),  Video Call service  and COVID-19 services and tools.   

In September 2019, healthdirect and The George Institute for Global Health launched a free online Risk Checker, an online evaluation tool to help Australian consumers check their risk of developing heart disease, diabetes or kidney disease.

See also
Health care in Australia
Telehealth

References

External links 

 
Healthdirect Symptom Checker 

2006 establishments in Australia
Australian companies established in 2006
Health care companies established in 2006
Council of Australian Governments
Health services companies of Australia
Health websites
Medical and health organisations based in Australia
E-government in Australia